Angelia "Angel" R. Trinidad (born September 17, 1990) is an American businesswoman and social entrepreneur. She is the founder and CEO of Passion Planner.

References

21st-century American businesspeople
American people of Filipino descent
People from San Diego
University of California, Los Angeles alumni
1990 births
Living people